The women's 800 metres event at the 1968 European Indoor Games was held on 10 March in Madrid.

Results

References

800 metres at the European Athletics Indoor Championships
800